DLS or D.L.S. may refer to:

Education
 Doctor of Liberal Studies, an academic degree

Organizations
 Democratic Left Scotland
 Danmarks Liberale Studerende or Liberal Students of Denmark
 Directorate Legal Services, or RAF Legal Branch
 Demosthenian Literary Society

Science
 Deep Lens Survey, Deep Gravitational Lensing Survey in astronomy
 Diamond Light Source, the UK's national synchrotron light source
 Dynamic light scattering, a technique in physics
 Dynamic Label Segment in Digital Audio Broadcasting

Computers
 Depth-limited search
 DLS formats, for digital music
 Dynamic Languages Symposium, a SIGPLAN programming conference

Other uses
 Dominion Land Survey, Canada
 Duckworth–Lewis–Stern method of calculating cricket scores
 Columbia Gorge Regional Airport, US, IATA code
 Dream League Soccer, an association football game